The Bad News Bears franchise consists of American sports-comedies, based on an original story by Bill Lancaster. The franchise includes theatrical films (the original release, its two sequels, and the 2005 remake), and a television series which aired from 1979-1980.

The franchise as a whole has been met with mixed-to-positive reception. While the original film received positive reaction from critics, with praise directed at its cast; its two sequels gained a mixed and negative reception, respectively. While the television series received an overall warmer response, the remake once again received a mixed-at-best reception from film critics.

Film

The Bad News Bears (1976)

The Bad News Bears in Breaking Training (1977)

The Bad News Bears Go to Japan (1978)

Bad News Bears (2005)

Television

Main cast and characters

Reception

Box office performance

Critical response

References

Comedy film series
1970s sports comedy films
Film franchises
American sports comedy films
Sports film series
Film series introduced in 1976
Paramount Pictures franchises
 
American baseball films